John Oti Bless (born October 19, 1979) is a Ghanaian politician and member of the Seventh Parliament of the Fourth Republic of Ghana representing the Nkwanta North Constituency in the Oti Region on the ticket of the National Democratic Congress.

Personal life 
Bless is a Christian (Church of Pentecost). He is married (with four children).

Early life and education 
Bless was born on October 19, 1979. He hails from Saboba, a town in the Northern Region of Ghana. He entered the University of Ghana and obtained his Diploma in Youth Development in 2002.

Politics 
Bless is a member of the National Democratic Congress (NDC). In 2012, he contested for the Nkwanta North seat on the ticket of the NDC sixth parliament of the fourth republic and won.

Employment 
 MD, Blessed Pharmacy/Blessed cleansing services, Accra
 Deputy Minister for local government and rural development, October 27, 2016 – January 6, 2017
 Member of Parliament (January 7, 2013 – present; 2nd term)

References 

Ghanaian MPs 2017–2021
1979 births
Living people
National Democratic Congress (Ghana) politicians
Ghanaian MPs 2021–2025